Ayesha Jennifer Verrall   (born 1979) is a New Zealand politician, infectious-diseases physician, and researcher with expertise in tuberculosis and international health. She is a Labour Party Member of the New Zealand Parliament and a Cabinet Minister with the roles of Minister of Health and Minister for Research, Science and Innovation. She has worked as a senior lecturer at the University of Otago, Wellington and as a member of the Capital and Coast District Health Board. During the COVID-19 pandemic she provided the Ministry of Health with an independent review and recommendations for its contact-tracing approach to COVID-19 cases.

Early life and education 
Verrall was born in Invercargill to Lathee and Bill and raised in Te Anau. Her mother, who grew up in the Maldives, was the first person in the country to pass Cambridge examinations in English and study in New Zealand on a scholarship. Verrall is named after her grandmother who died when Lathee was two years old. In 1997 she was a member of the New Zealand Youth Parliament, selected to represent Clutha-Southland MP Bill English.

Verrall trained in medicine at the University of Otago Dunedin School of Medicine, where she obtained her Bachelor of Medicine, Bachelor of Surgery (MBChB) in 2004. She was president of the Otago University Students' Association in 2001 where she lobbied for interest-free student loans and in 2003 also led the formation of the New Zealand Medical Student Journal (NZMSJ).

During the next decade, Verrall trained in tropical medicine, bioethics and international health in the United Kingdom, Singapore and Peru. Verrall earned an MSc from the London School of Hygiene & Tropical Medicine and a Diploma in Tropical Medicine and Hygiene from the University of Alabama through the Gorgas Institute in Lima, Peru.

In 2018, Verrall completed her PhD in tuberculosis epidemiology at the University of Otago, in collaboration with Padjadjaran University in Indonesia and Radboud University Nijmegen in the Netherlands. Her research investigated the early clearance immune response to the Mycobacterium tuberculosis infection among Indonesian people who were highly exposed to the bacteria, yet remained uninfected. She developed the Innate Factors in Early Clearance of M. tuberculosis (INFECT) cohort as part of her dissertation.

Career 
Before entering national politics, Verrall was a senior lecturer at University of Otago in the Department of Pathology and Molecular Medicine. She taught microbiology to medical students and researched tuberculosis epidemiology, immunology and host-pathogen interactions.

Verrall was also an infectious diseases physician at the Capital and Coast District Health Board in Wellington and became an elected member of its board in the 2019 local elections. She stood representing the Labour Party and was appointed by the Minister of Health, David Clark, as deputy board chair. She also provided advice to the government on vaccines, outbreaks and disease prevention. During the 2019–2020 New Zealand measles outbreak, she advocated for a more strategic approach to allocating more government funding and resources towards increasing vaccination rates for measles, as well as preventing future outbreaks.

In March 2020, during the ongoing COVID-19 pandemic, Verrall called for the New Zealand Government to urgently improve their data on community spread of the coronavirus disease COVID-19 through expanding the testing criteria beyond sick people, increasing laboratory testing and contact tracing capabilities. At the time, the Ministry of Health was tracing the contacts of 50 cases per day; Verrall called for up to 1000 people's contacts to be traced every day by increasing the number of staff in public health units, central call centres and investing in technology that could make the contact tracing process instantaneous.

Subsequently, Verrall was commissioned by the ministry to provide an independent audit of its contact tracing programme. The report was initially submitted to the ministry in early April and made publicly available on 20 April to allow the government time to respond and implement some of the recommendations. Verrall's audit identified shortcomings in the health sector's approach, which she concluded was "understaffed and lacked cohesion" and could only trace up to 185 cases. The country's 12 "devolved" public health units made it difficult to coordinate data systems nationally and slowed down the process of contacting people. The ministry had developed a national automated system for contact tracing which had yet to be rolled out at the time of Verrall's audit. Verrall cautioned that although the quality of the contact tracing was good, its scalability remained an issue. The ministry accepted Verrall's recommendations and began implementing them, as well as improving and implementing its nationwide automated contact tracing system, as the country moved to a less-strict lockdown measure on 28 April. In June 2020, Verrall was invited by the World Health Organization to share her audit report as an example of best practice.

Political career 

In June 2020 it was announced Verrall would seek election to the New Zealand Parliament, running for the Labour Party. Although she did not run in any of New Zealand's 72 geographical electorates, Labour placed her 17th on their list, which all but guaranteed that she would enter Parliament in the 2020 election.

During the 2020 New Zealand general election that was held on 17 October, the Labour Party won 50.0% of the party vote, and Verrall was elected into Parliament as a list MP. Newshub described her as a potential candidate for the Minister of Health.

In November 2020, Verrall was inducted into the Labour government's Cabinet, holding the portfolios of Minister for Seniors, Minister for Food Safety, Associate Minister of Health and Associate Minister of Research, Science and Innovation. In April 2021, Verrall also became acting Minister of Conservation when Kiri Allan went on medical leave. She picked up a delegation as Associate Minister for COVID-19 Response in February 2022.

As Associate Minister of Health, Verrall unveiled the Government's new Smokefree 2025 plan in early December 2021. As part of the plan, the Government plans to introduce legislation banning anyone under the age of 14 from legally purchasing tobacco for the rest of their lives. Older generations will only be permitted to buy tobacco products with very low-levels of nicotine while fewer shops will be allowed to sell tobacco products.

In a June 2022 reshuffle, Verrall was appointed as Minister for COVID-19 Response and Minister for Research, Science and Innovation, while retaining her Seniors portfolio and relinquishing the Food Safety role to Meka Whaitiri.

In a February 2023 reshuffle under new Prime Minister Chris Hipkins, Verrall was appointed as Minister of Health, replacing Andrew Little. She retained the Minister for Research, Science and Innovation portfolio with the Minister for Seniors portfolio moving to Ginny Andersen. The Minister for COVID-19 Response portfolio merged with the Health portfolio.

Awards and honours 
Verrall is a Fellow of the Royal Australasian College of Physicians (FRACP).

The Verrall Award, granted by the New Zealand Medical Student Journal, is named after her, to honour her efforts to form and secure funding for the journal in 2003.

Personal life 
Verrall has one daughter with her partner Alice. Maldivian politician Mohamed Nasheed is her cousin.

Selected works and publications

References

External links
 

|-

|-

|-

|-

1979 births
Living people
People from Invercargill
University of Otago alumni
Alumni of the London School of Hygiene & Tropical Medicine
University of Alabama alumni
Academic staff of the University of Otago
Capital and Coast District Health Board members
Fellows of the Royal Australasian College of Physicians
LGBT physicians
LGBT women
New Zealand Labour Party politicians
Candidates in the 2020 New Zealand general election
LGBT academics
New Zealand Labour Party MPs
New Zealand list MPs
Women members of the New Zealand House of Representatives
LGBT members of the Parliament of New Zealand
New Zealand people of Maldivian descent
21st-century New Zealand LGBT people
New Zealand Youth MPs
Members of the Cabinet of New Zealand
Women government ministers of New Zealand